The Museo Archivo de la Fotografía (MAF; Museum of the Photographic Archive) is a museum in the Historic center of Mexico City located in "La Casa de las Ajaracas", built at the end of the 16th century, at Guatemala street #34. The museum is dedicated to the conservation, research and distribution of photography.

External links

References

Museums in Mexico City
Photography museums and galleries in Mexico